The Academy for Advanced Academics (AAA) is a SACS accredited dual-enrollment secondary school in Miami, Florida, United States. It is a part of the Miami-Dade County Public Schools System and is situated at the Modesto A. Maidique and Biscayne Bay campuses of Florida International University.

Background 
The Academy for Advanced Academics is fully accredited by the Southern Association of Colleges and Schools (SACS).

AAA is designed for motivated and academically talented 11th and 12th grade students whose needs are not met in the traditional high school setting. The Academy's rigid application process ensures the students will be able to excel in an environment where the allotted 8 courses per semester are either college courses or AP classes taught by the tight knit faculty. AAA South students apply from five senior high schools in the district ( Ronald W. Reagan/Doral High School, John A. Ferguson High School, G. Holmes Braddock High School, Felix Varela High School and Miami Coral Park High School). Academy for Advanced Academics (AAA) is a combined effort of Florida International University (FIU) and Miami-Dade County Public Schools (MDCPS) initiated in the summer of the 2009 school year.

Each semester, students are enrolled in a minimum of three (3) college dual-enrollment courses, taught by FIU faculty, and four (4) high school courses, taught by M-DCPS faculty. This opportunity for acceleration offers the opportunity of graduating high school with an associate degree as well, the equivalent of two completed college years. The AAA student population maximum capacity is 100, with about only 50 students per graduating class.

Founding faculty and staff (2009) of the Academy for Advanced Academics includes English Teacher Karen Adams, Social Studies Teacher John Burkowski, Counselor Gianeris Chedebeaux, Mathematics Teacher Gemma Alberto, Activities Director Dennis Lindsay, Clerical Maria De Armas and Program Principal Omar Monteagudo. As of 2015, the current Counselor is Rita Estorino.

In 2011, a second chapter was opened on the Biscayne Bay Campus of FIU. AAA North currently hosts students from Alonzo and Tracy Mourning Senior High Biscayne Bay Campus and Dr. Michael M. Krop Senior High School. AAA North's founding faculty and staff includes English Teacher Martha Cabrera, Social Studies Teacher Arabpour-Pinder, Counselor Bridget Smith, Mathematics Teacher Barbara Schpilberg and Clerical Lorraine Bembry. As of 2016, the current Mathematics Teacher is Miguel Acosta, the current English Teacher is Natalia Romero and the current counselor is Odalys Ochoa.

Clubs and Organizations 
The following clubs and organizations are active at the school:
National Honor Society
Mu Alpha Theta - Mathematics Honor Society
RADIX - A.A.A.'s literary magazine.
A.A.A.'s Mentor Club
Key Club
Rho Kappa Social Studies Honor Society - Model UN, Geography Bee, History Bee, PINNS, Debate Watch Parties
Science National Honor Society
FIRST Robotics Competition
AAA Music Club

See also
School for Advanced Studies

References

External links

Miamiherald.com
News.fiu.edu

High schools in Miami-Dade County, Florida
Public high schools in Florida
Educational institutions established in 2009
2009 establishments in Florida